Hylaeamys laticeps, also known as the Atlantic Forest oryzomys or the large-headed rice rat, is a species of rodent in the family Cricetidae.

The rodent is endemic to the Atlantic Forest region of southeastern Brazil.

The taxonomic history of Hylaeamys laticeps has been complex, and the name laticeps has been used for various members of the genera Cerradomys, Euryoryzomys, Transandinomys and Hylaeamys at different times. Until 2006, it was classified in the genus Oryzomys as Oryzomys laticeps. The species Oryzomys seuanezi is now a junior synonym of H. laticeps.

References

Literature cited
Musser, G. G. and M. D. Carleton. 2005. Superfamily Muroidea. pp. 894–1531 in Mammal Species of the World a Taxonomic and Geographic Reference. D. E. Wilson and D. M. Reeder eds. Johns Hopkins University Press, Baltimore.

 

Hylaeamys
Rodents of South America
Mammals of Brazil
Endemic fauna of Brazil
Fauna of the Atlantic Forest
Mammals described in 1840
Taxa named by Peter Wilhelm Lund